The 2011 Women's Cricket World Cup Qualifier was a ten-team tournament held in Bangladesh in November 2011 to decide the final four qualifiers for the 2013 Women's Cricket World Cup. Additionally, the top two teams, excluding Sri Lanka and West Indies, would qualify for the 2012 ICC Women's World Twenty20.

First round

Group A

Group B

Knockout round

Quarterfinals

Semifinals

Final

Classification round

9th place

5th–8th place play-off

7th place play-off

5th place play-off

3rd place play-off

Final standings

Notes

References

External links
 Series home at ESPN Cricinfo

2003
2011 in Bangladeshi cricket
2011 in women's cricket
International cricket competitions in 2011
International women's cricket competitions in Bangladesh
November 2011 sports events in Bangladesh
Qualifier